Euchromius klimeschi is a species of moth in the family Crambidae. It is found in Ethiopia, Somalia, Kenya, Tanzania, Zaire, Zambia, Zimbabwe, Madagascar, Mozambique, South Africa and Namibia.

The length of the forewings is 12–15 mm. The groundcolour of the forewings is creamy white, densely suffused with ochreous brown to brown scales. The hindwings are grey-brown with a darkly bordered termen. Adults are on wing from October to December and from February to March. In Somalia, adults have also been recorded in April, May and June.

References

Crambinae
Lepidoptera of the Democratic Republic of the Congo
Lepidoptera of Ethiopia
Lepidoptera of Kenya
Lepidoptera of Mozambique
Lepidoptera of Namibia
Lepidoptera of South Africa
Lepidoptera of Uganda
Lepidoptera of Zambia
Lepidoptera of Zimbabwe
Moths of Madagascar
Moths of Sub-Saharan Africa
Moths described in 1961